An Escort Group consisted of several small warships organized and trained to operate together protecting trade convoys. Escort groups were a World War II tactical innovation in anti-submarine warfare by the Royal Navy to combat the threat of the Kriegsmarines "wolfpack" tactics. Early escort groups often contained destroyers, sloops, naval trawlers  and, later, corvettes of differing specifications lacking the ability to maneuver together as a flotilla of similar warships, but rigorously trained in anti-submarine tactics to use teamwork emphasizing the unique sensors, weapons, speed, and turning radius of each ship. The development of these 'escort groups' proved an effective means of defending shipping convoys through the Battle of the Atlantic.

Background
Based on experience during World War I, the Admiralty instituted trade convoys in United Kingdom coastal waters from September 1939. During the first year of the Battle of the Atlantic British convoy protection was the responsibility of the Western Approaches Command (WAC), based first in Plymouth, then, as the focus of the campaign moved after the 1940 Fall of France, in Liverpool.  The newest and most capable destroyers were assigned to screen capital ships of the Home Fleet; so, to augment the inadequate number of purpose-designed sloops, WAC was allocated a leftover array of limited production prototypes, ships built to foreign specifications, minesweepers, militarized yachts, and fishing trawlers, and survivors of elderly destroyer classes no longer considered suitable for operation with the Home Fleet. These escorts were not numerous enough or sufficiently long-ranged to accompany convoys across the Atlantic, but would screen convoys to and from meeting points thought to be beyond U-boat range defining the edge of the Western Approaches.

Convoy escorts were initially assigned on an ad hoc basis, dispatched as and when available, and arrived singly or in small groups. Command of the escort force fell to the senior officer present and could change as each new ship arrived. Any tactical arrangements had to be made on the spot and communicated by a signal lamp to each ship in turn. The ships were unaccustomed to working together and often had no common battle plan or tactics.

These deficiencies led to a major defeat in October 1940 when Convoy HX 79 from Halifax to Liverpool was attacked by a wolfpack of five U-boats remaining after an attack on convoy SC 7. Initially unprotected, a force of 11 warships were assembled but 12 ships in the convoy were sunk from attacks during the night while none of the U-boats were damaged.

The loss of ships from both SC 7 and HX 79 gave the impetus for Admiral Percy Noble, the commander-in-chief of WAC, to form discrete groups. These Escort Groups often consisted of mixed types of small warships, but later were sometimes formed from a single class (e.g. the 1st, 3rd, 4th, 5th, 15th, and 21st Escort Groups were composed entirely of s when these ships became available to replace the older ships originally assigned to those groups.)

Service history
In 1941 WAC had 8 escort groups formed. These typically comprised four to eight ships, under the command of an RN officer, usually a commander or lieutenant commander. By operating together under a single leader, groups were able to develop group tactics and practice their use; with the issue of a single short command the various ships of the group, often out of sight of each other, could be relied upon to act in a coordinated fashion. In ten days in 1941, four U-boats were sunk with the loss of three of Germany's top U-boat commanders. Later these tactics were standardized and taught to all escort group commanders at the Western Approaches Tactical Unit (WATU). The WATU was an RN analysis team founded in early 1942 to study the conduct of convoy operations using wargames and lectures. The unit, made up of naval officers and the young women of the WRNS disseminated instructions to over 5,000 Allied officers with "considerable success".

This level of teamwork was never achieved by the attacking U-boats. Although the wolfpack was co-ordinated in that several boats would be concentrated on a target convoy, once gathered the boats would attack individually without any attempt at further co-operation. It was not unknown for U-boats to get in each other's way whilst attacking or collide with each other. Time and again during the Battle of the Atlantic relatively small, well-handled escort groups were able to frustrate attacks by more numerous groups of U-boats and ensure the "safe and timely arrival" of their charges.
In one example, in November 1942, Convoy ON 144 of 33 ships from Britain to North America protected by the Mid-Ocean Escort Force B6 of five Flower-class corvettes, was attacked by a group of ten U-boats. Over the next three days they fought off attacks by the wolfpack for the loss of five ships and one corvette; 28 ships arrived safely.
Following this action, the Senior Officer Escort (SOE) – commander of the group – was "warmly congratulated" for preventing what could have been a major disaster, and the contrast with HX 79 was apparent.

In practice, escort group cohesion was impaired by frequent changes of escort personnel and transferring ships between groups. Personnel shuffling was inevitable as trained crewmen with combat experience were promoted and transferred to the expanding fleet of new ships. Shuffling of ships from one escort group to another was often necessary to maintain escort group strength by replacing ships temporarily disabled by battle damage or the frequent machinery breakdowns of older warships. The following list includes some duplication reflecting reassignments at the time of compilation. The original eight escort groups and the Canadian 14th through 25th escort groups were reorganized into the Mid-Ocean Escort Force (MOEF) in February and March 1942 with ships of the 9th Escort Group serving as leaders of MOEF groups B1 through B5. The ships of the earlier groups which had only a short-range and were unsuitable for MOEF duty were reassigned to the Western Local Escort Force or duty with coastal convoys or the arctic convoys supplying the Soviet Union. The 36th through 44th escort groups remained relatively unchanged escorting convoys between Liverpool and Gibraltar and Sierra Leone.

Organization
The following escort groups had been formed prior to United States Navy escort participation in the autumn of 1941:

1st Escort Group

 Thornycroft type destroyer leader: 
 V and W-class destroyer: 
 Town-class destroyers:  &  
 Admiralty S-class destroyers:  & 

2nd Escort Group

 Admiralty type flotilla leader: 
 V and W-class destroyer: 
 Town-class destroyers:  & 
 Admiralty R-class destroyer: 
 Admiralty S-class destroyer: 
 Flower-class corvettes: ,  &

3rd Escort Group

 Thornycroft prototype destroyer: 
 Yarrow prototype destroyer: 
 B-class destroyer: 
 Town-class destroyers:  & 

4th Escort Group
 B-class destroyers:  & 
 Town-class destroyers: ,  & 

5th Escort Group

 V and W-class destroyers: ,  & 
 Town-class destroyer: 

6th Escort Group
 Thornycroft type destroyer leader: 
 V and W-class destroyers:  & 
 Town-class destroyers: ,  & 

7th Escort Group
 V and W-class destroyers:  & 
 Town-class destroyers:  & 

8th Escort Group
 Admiralty type flotilla leader: 
 V and W-class destroyer: 
 Town-class destroyers:  &  
 Admiralty S-class destroyers:  & 

9th Escort Group

10th Escort Group

 V and W-class destroyers: ,  &

11th Escort Group

 G and H-class destroyer: 
 N-class destroyer:

12th Escort Group

14th Escort Group

 C and D-class destroyers:  & 
 Ex-Brazilian destroyers:  & 
 Town-class destroyer:

15th Escort Group
 Canadian River-class destroyer: 
 Town-class destroyer: 
 Flower-class corvettes: ,  &

16th Escort Group
 Town-class destroyer: 
 Flower-class corvettes: ,  &

17th Escort Group
 Town-class destroyer: 
 Flower-class corvettes: ,  &

18th Escort Group
 Town-class destroyer: 
 Flower-class corvettes: ,  &

19th Escort Group
 Town-class destroyer: 
 Flower-class corvettes: ,  &

20th Escort Group
 Town-class destroyer: 
 Flower-class corvettes: ,  &

21st Escort Group
 Town-class destroyer: 

22nd Escort Group
 Town-class destroyer: 
 Flower-class corvettes: ,  &

23rd Escort Group
 Town-class destroyers:  & 
 Flower-class corvettes:  &

24th Escort Group
 Canadian River-class destroyer: 
 Flower-class corvettes: ,  &

25th Escort Group
 Town-class destroyer: 
 Flower-class corvettes: ,  &

36th Escort Group

 Bittern-class sloop: 
 Grimsby-class sloop: 

37th Escort Group

 Black Swan-class sloop: 
 Shoreham-class sloop: 

40th Escort Group

 Town-class destroyer: 
 Shoreham-class sloop: 

41st Escort Group
 Town-class destroyer: 
 Black Swan-class sloop: 
 Bittern-class sloop: 
 Grimsby-class sloop: 
 Banff-class sloops:  &

42nd Escort Group
 Shoreham-class sloop: 
 Hastings-class sloop: 
 Grimsby-class sloops:  & 
 Banff-class sloops:  &

43rd Escort Group
 Town-class destroyer: 
 Shoreham-class sloop: 
 Hastings-class sloop: 
 Bridgewater-class sloop: 
 Grimsby-class sloops: 
 Armed yacht:

44th Escort Group
 Town-class destroyer: 
 Egret-class sloop: 
 Hastings-class sloop: 
 Grimsby-class sloop: 
 Banff-class sloops:  &

See also
 Mid-Ocean Escort Force
 Escort Group B2
 Escort Group B6
 Escort Group B7
 5th Escort Group
 36th Escort Group
 Hunter-killer Group

References

Citations

Bibliography

 
 
 

Naval warfare tactics